This is a list of non-profit organisations working in the area of rare diseases.

International

ICD coding for rare diseases
International Coalition of Organizations Supporting Endocrine Patients (ICOSEP) 
Rare Diseases International (RDI) 
International Conference on Rare Diseases & Orphan Drugs (ICORD) 
NGO Committee for Rare Diseases
Global Commission to End the Diagnostic Odyssey for Children
Rare Disease Day
Asia Pacific Alliance of Rare Disease Organisations (APARDO) 
International Rare Diseases Research Consortium (IRDiRC) 
Orphanet
RareConnect
APEC LSIF Rare Disease Network
Indo US Organization for Rare Diseases (IndoUSrare)

Africa
 Foundation for Neuromuscular Support Nigeria
 Rare Diseases Ghana
 Hemophilia Foundation of Nigeria
 Rare Disease Nigeria
 Cardiac Community

Asia
ORGANIZATION FOR RARE DISEASES INDIA
POMPE FOUNDATION INDIA
Taiwan Foundation for Rare Disorders (TFRD) 
Hong Kong Alliance for Rare Diseases (HKARD) 
Illness Challenge Foundation (ICF) 
China-Dolls Center for Rare Disorders (CCRD) 
Indian Organisation For Rare Diseases

Europe 
 European Organisation for Rare Diseases (EURORDIS) 
 ERA-Net for Research Programmes on Rare Diseases  (E-Rare) 
 European Union Committee of Experts on Rare Diseases (EUCERD) 
 INNOVCare
 RD-Connect
 European Platform for Rare Disease Registries (EPIRARE) 
 The World Association of Orphan Diseases (WAO(R)D) 
 The World Association of Cured Rare Diseases (WACRD)

United Kingdom 
Rare Disease UK
Rare Autoinflammatory Conditions Community - UK
 The Aarskog Foundation

United States 
 The National Organization for Rare Disorders (NORD) was established in 1983 by individuals and families with rare diseases.
 EveryLife Foundation for Rare Diseases Founded in 2009 by Dr. Emil Kakkis The EveryLife Foundation for Rare Diseases is a 501(c)(3) nonprofit, nonpartisan organization dedicated to empowering the rare disease patient community to advocate for impactful, science-driven legislation and policy that advances the equitable development of and access to lifesaving diagnoses, treatments and cures.
 Genetic Alliance, established in 1986, lists information and support groups for approximately 1200 rare diseases.
 The Global Genes Project is one of the leading rare and genetic disease patient advocacy organizations in the world. The non-profit organization is led by Team R.A.R.E. (R.A.R.E stands for Rare disease, Advocacy, Research and Education). Global Genes promotes the needs of the rare and genetic disease community under a unifying symbol of hope – the Blue Denim Genes Ribbon™. What began as a grassroots movement in 2009 with a few rare disease parent advocates and foundations has grown to over 500 global organizations. Global Genes uses a simple concept of "genes and jeans" to broadly promote the needs of the rare and genetic disease community. The organization has launched a number of innovative rare and genetic disease awareness campaigns including, Hope, It's In Our Genes™, Wear That You Care™, 7,000 Bracelets for Hope™ to represent the 7,000 different rare diseases and Unite 1 Million For RARE™ disease. Other nonprofit organizations in the United States include the Rare Undiagnosed Network (RUN) and the Undiagnosed Diseases Network.
 The Office of Rare Diseases Research (ORDR) 
 Rare Disease Cures Accelerator-Data and Analytics Platform (RDCA-DAP) 
 Rare Kids Network
 Rare & Undiagnosed Network (RUN) 
 Swan USA
 Undiagnosed Diseases Network (UDN)

Canada 
 The Canadian Organization for Rare Disorders (CORD) is the national network of organizations who represent people affected by rare disorders within Canada. CORD's intention is to provide a strong common voice advocating for a healthcare system and health policy for those with rare disorders.

References 

Rare disease organisations